Trithionic acid is a polythionic acid consisting of three sulfur atoms. It can be viewed as two bisulfite radicals bridged by a sulfur atom.

References

Sulfur oxoacids